Hellbore could refer to:
 A heavy weapon in several science fiction series.
 A turret-mounted weapon of the Bolo tanks in the Bolo novels written by Keith Laumer and David Weber.
 A long-range weapon in the Starfleet Battles and Starfleet Command games.
 A weapon in the Orion's Arm SF universe.
 A weapon module in the second Star Control game.
 A type of gravitational weapon in the Space Empires game series.
 Hellebore, one of approximately 20 species of plants that belongs to the genus Helleborus
 Hellebore magazine, A popular folk horror magazine